The flamenquín is an Andalusian dish made with slices of jamón serrano wrapped in pieces of pork loin, coated breadcrumb batter, and deep-fried. It is often garnished with French fries and mayonnaise. A common variation replaces the loin with boiled ham. It can also be made with other fillings, such as fish, cheese, or poultry.

See also
Roulade
Spanish cuisine

Andalusian cuisine
Ham dishes
Deep fried foods
Stuffed dishes